The Vietnam Buddhist Sangha (abbreviated as VBS, Vietnamese: Giáo hội Phật giáo Việt Nam) is the only Buddhist sangha recognised by the Vietnamese government, and a member of the Vietnamese Fatherland Front. It was founded after Vietnam's Buddhist Convention at Quán Sứ Pagoda on November 7, 1981, to unify Buddhist activities of Vietnamese monks, nuns and lay followers. The head of this sangha since 2021, the Most Venerable Thích Trí Quảng, is the acting Supreme Patriarch following the Most Venerable Thích Phổ Tuệ, who died on October 21, 2021, at the age of 105.

See also 
Buddhist Association of China
Korea Buddhists Federation
Central Spiritual Board of Buddhists of the USSR

References

External links
 Buddhist Temple of Vietnam
 Vietnamese Buddhist Families
 Phật sự Online - The official news agency of the Sangha
 An Viên Youtube Channel - the Sangha-owned television channel
 Vietnamese Buddhist Portal - The Sangha's official website

Buddhism in Vietnam
Buddhist organizations
Religious organizations established in 1981
1981 establishments in Vietnam